Jean-Pierre Jamieson (born 15 February 1995) is a South African professional rugby union player who last played for the  in the Currie Cup and in the Rugby Challenge. His regular position is hooker.

Rugby career

Youth / Varsity Cup rugby

Jamieson didn't feature in any school provincial competitions for Eastern Province, but in 2013 – while still in the Under-18 age group, he was included in the  squad that participated in Group B of the 2013 Under-19 Provincial Championship. He started four of their seven matches during the regular season, scoring a try in a 42–20 victory over the  team to help his side finish in third position on the log to secure a semi-final spot. He also started in their 27–20 win over Eastern Cape rivals  in the promotion play-off match, as his side won 27–20 to win promotion to Group A for 2014.

He was a key member of the squad that played in the 2014 event, making nine starts and two appearances off the bench in their twelve matches during the campaign.

For 2015, Jamieson was included in the  squad for their season in the Group A of the 2015 Under-21 Provincial Championship, their first season at that level after winning promotion from Group B at the end of 2014. The team struggled to adjust at this level, winning just one of their twelve matches during the season to finish bottom of the log, but Jamieson once again established himself as a regular in the side, making ten starts and appearing as a replacement in their other two matches.

At the start of 2016, Jamieson was included in the  squad that participated in the 2016 Varsity Cup tournament. He made four appearances in a disappointing season for NMMU as they finish second-last in the competition.

Eastern Province Kings

At the end of 2015, serious financial problems at the  saw a number of first team regulars leave the union and Jamieson was among a number of youngsters that were promoted to the squad that competed in the 2016 Currie Cup qualification series.

References

South African rugby union players
Living people
1995 births
Rugby union players from Port Elizabeth
People from Port Elizabeth
Rugby union hookers
Eastern Province Elephants players